Carville may refer to:

Places
Carville, Calvados, Normandy, France
Carville-la-Folletière, Seine-Maritime, Normandy, France
Carville-Pot-de-Fer, Seine-Maritime, Normandy, France
Carville, Louisiana, U.S
Carville, Maryland, U.S., see Maryland and Delaware Railroad
Carville, San Francisco, California, an historic neighborhood in the Sunset District

It may also be a misspelling of:
Carrville, County Durham, England

Other uses
 Carville (surname)

See also
Carvel (disambiguation)